Ross Friedman (born January 3, 1954), also known as Ross the Boss, is a guitarist, known as a founding member of both the punk band the Dictators, and the heavy metal band Manowar.

History
Friedman was born in the Bronx, New York,  and formed the punk rock band the Dictators with Andy Shernoff in New Paltz, New York, in 1973. Prior to this, Friedman had played in a local band, Total Crudd. After recording three albums with the Dictators, Friedman went to France and worked for one year in Fabienne Shine's band Shakin' Street. On Black Sabbath's Heaven and Hell tour in 1980 (on which Shakin' Street were the support act), Friedman was introduced to bass player Joey DeMaio by Ronnie James Dio. Later in 1980, Friedman and DeMaio formed Manowar, with whom he recorded six albums before DeMaio asked him to leave the band after the 1988 album Kings of Metal.

Timeline
In 1990, Friedman joined Manitoba's Wild Kingdom with fellow Dictators Andy Shernoff and Handsome Dick Manitoba. With drummer J. P. Patterson the band released the album ...And You? to critical acclaim. The album was in heavy rotation on MTV.

In 1994, Friedman had a blues rock band called "Heyday" and in 1999 CMC records released the Spinatras album @Midnight.com, a band whom Friedman has described as "The Dictators meet Cheap Trick".

The Dictators started playing again in 1996, touring heavily.  In 2001, with original rhythm guitar player Scott Kempner now back in the fold, the band released their album "D.F.F.D." which they then toured to support in the US and Europe. A resulting live album was released from the European tour, entitled "Viva Dictators".

In 2004, Friedman joined Albert Bouchard, the original drummer for Blue Öyster Cult, in his band Brain Surgeons. He also recorded an instrumental album with Dictators drummer JP Thunderbolt Patterson, called "Thunderboss"

In July 2005, Friedman joined Manowar onstage at the Earthshaker Festival; performing "Metal Daze" and "Dark Avenger" with them. At the end of the concert, he also performed "Battle Hymn", with other past and present members of Manowar.

In April 2006, he played one night of early Manowar music at the Keep It True VI Festival in Germany, backed by German Manowar cover band Men of War, featuring members of German groups Ivory Night and Divinus.  That band (later changed name to Ross the Boss or "The RTB Band") went on to play some more festivals in Germany, Italy and Greece and then began working on new original material.

In August 2006, Thunderboss was released on Poptown Records. Thunderboss was written and arranged by J.P. Thunderbolt Patterson and featured Friedman on all 11 tracks. The CD met with some critical acclaim, but was not successful enough to keep Friedman interested in the project, so there was no supporting tour.

In October 2006, Friedman and The Dictators played Friday and Saturday nights of the closing weekend at punk rock venue CBGBs, one of the clubs where they got their start.

2007 started off with an eleven city tour of Spain with JP Patterson and their Spanish super-band "The Thunderbolts" which also includes members of Bummer and Sex Museum.

Friedman guested on former band-mate Fabienne Shine's 2007 LP, Wotan's LP "Epos" where he played Grand Piano on one track, and Atlantean Kodex's 2007 EP.

Friedman's 2008 included an appearance with Manitoba's Wild Kingdom at the 2008 Joey Ramone Birthday Bash, performances with Shakin' Street at the Sweden Rock Festival, and a few tour dates in Spain with The Dictators. He released a new album in August with his German Metal Band under the name "Ross the Boss" called "New Metal Leader" which debuted at #99 in the German Album charts.  The following month he appeared on Inner Demons, the 2nd CD by New Jersey metallers Skullshifter, playing lead guitar on the track "Etched in Sand".

In August 2009, Friedman debuted his "Ross the Boss" band in the US at the Brooklyn, New York venue Europa, to favorable reviews.

On November 2010, Friedman and his German Metal Band released the followup to "New Metal Leader", "Hailstorm", which received 4.5 out of 5 stars on AllMusic.com.

In May 2011, Friedman was a special guest at the 11th Annual Joey Ramone Birthday Bash in New York city, performing, among other songs, "Stop Thinking About It" with fellow Dictator Andy Shernoff. In June, Friedman was invited to co-headline Venezuela's Gillmanfest. In the coming months with the Ross the Boss band he performed at several festivals in Europe, including Masters of Rock in the Czech Republic.

Friedman also owns and manages a small business called "The Cage Baseball NYC." He runs "The Cage" with his wife and son. His son teaches classes at "The Cage," while his wife runs the clinics and manages the business when Friedman is on tour.

In early 2012, vocalist Sean Peck Cage, guitarists Friedman and Stu Marshall, bassist Mike Davis and drummer Rhino formed a metal supergroup, Death Dealer. Death Dealer began as an online collaboration between Marshall and Peck. All they needed to tell Friedman about the project to get him on board was that Rhino was on drums. Although Friedman and Rhino are both former members of Manowar, they'd only ever played together for one song at the Earthshaker Festival in 2005. They both had always meant to do something together. In June 2013, Death Dealer released a full-length studio album called War Master. The 2015 follow up release "Hallowed Ground" featured drummer Steve Bolognese from Into Eternity.

He brought down the house as the surprise guest star at the 2016 Keep It True Festival with a new all-Manowar-songs "Ross The Boss Band" that hails from his hometown of New York City. The band includes bass player Kevin Bolembach, his nephew Lance Barnewold on drums, and singer Mike Cotoia of Fate Breaks Dawn who has a six octave range. 

On January 18, 2017, Ross was inducted into the Hall of Heavy Metal History for his contributions to speed metal while in Manowar.

In 2022, Ross was featured in the song Armpits of Immortals by Italian comedy heavy metal band Nanowar of Steel.

Discography 
The Dictators
 The Dictators Go Girl Crazy! (1975)
 Manifest Destiny (1977)
 Bloodbrothers (1978)
 Fuck 'Em If They Can't Take A Joke (1981)
 New York City (1998)
 DFFD (2001)
 ¡Viva Dictators! (2005)
 Everyday is Saturday (2007)

Shakin' Street
 Shakin' Street (1980)
 Live and Raw (1989)
 Live (2004)
 21st Century Love Channel (2009)

Manowar
 Battle Hymns (1982)
 Into Glory Ride (1983)
 Hail to England (1984)
 Sign of the Hammer (1984)
 Fighting The World (1987)
 Kings of Metal (1988)

Manitoba's Wild Kingdom
 ... And You? (1990)

Heyday
 Heyday (1994)

The Hellacopters
 Payin' the Dues (1997)

David Roter Method
 Find Something Beautiful (1997)

The Spinatras
 @Midnight.com (1999)

The Nomads
 Showdown, Vol. 2: The 90's (2002)

Thunderboss
 Thunderbolt Patterson with Ross the Boss (2004)

Majesty
 Sword and Sorcery (2002)

The Brain Surgeons
 Black Hearts of Soul (2004)
 Denial of Death (2006)

DawnRider
 Fate is Calling, Pt 1 (2005)

The Thunderbolts
 The Thunderbolts (2006)

Wotan
 Epos (2007)

Fabienne Shine and the Planets
 Fabienne Shine and the planets (2007)

Atlantean Kodex
 The Pnakotic Demos (2007)

Burning Starr
 Land of the Dead (2011)

Ross The Boss
 New Metal Leader (2008)
 Hailstorm (2010)
 By Blood Sworn (2018)
 Born of Fire (2020)

Death Dealer
 War Master (2013)
 Hallowed Ground (2015)

Bloody Times
 Alliance (Single) (2018)
 On A Mission (Album) (2019)

Burning Witches
 Battle Hymn (from the Dance With the Devil album) (2020)

Nanowar of Steel
 Armpits of Immortals (2022)

References

External links
Ross-The-Boss.com The Official Ross The Boss Website
2005 Ross the Boss Interview with Brian D. Holland

1954 births
20th-century American guitarists
American heavy metal guitarists
American punk rock guitarists
Jewish American musicians
Jewish heavy metal musicians
Living people
Manowar members
Musicians from the Bronx
Protopunk musicians
The Dictators members